Melitaea deserticola, the desert fritillary, is a butterfly of the family Nymphalidae. It is found in North Africa (Morocco, Algeria, Libya and Egypt), Lebanon, Israel, Jordan, Saudi Arabia and Yemen.

The larvae feed on Linaria aegyptiaca, Plantago media, Anarrhinum fruticosum and Anarrhinum species.

Subspecies
Melitaea deserticola deserticola (North Africa)
Melitaea deserticola macromaculata Belter, 1934 (Syria, Lebanon, Israel, Jordan, western Saudi Arabia)
Melitaea deserticola scotti Higgins, 1941 (Yemen, Oman)

References

Butterflies described in 1909
Melitaea